Ian Doescher  (born 1977) is an American fiction writer, best known as the author of the plays in the William Shakespeare's Star Wars trilogy series, Verily, a New Hope (2013), The Empire Striketh Back (2014), and The Jedi Doth Return (2014), parodic retellings of George Lucas's Star Wars film trilogy (1977–1983) in blank verse and 16th-century style of William Shakespeare.

Personal life
Doescher has a B.A. in Music from Yale University, a Master of Divinity from Yale Divinity School, and a Ph.D. in Ethics from Union Theological Seminary. He lives with his wife and two children in Portland, Oregon.

Doescher claims to be only a Star Wars and Star Trek fan and not well versed in other science-fiction literature. The idea for WSSW came to him when he went to the Oregon Shakespeare Festival in Ashland shortly after reading Pride and Prejudice and Zombies. After the first draft was shown to Lucasfilm, their response was "We like this and it’s fun, but we’d like to see Ian do more with it. Go ahead and have some more fun with it, and go out of bounds of movie itself", so he rewrote it.

Works
William Shakespeare's Star Wars:
William Shakespeare's Star Wars: Verily, a New Hope (2013)
William Shakespeare's The Empire Striketh Back: Star Wars Part the Fifth (2014)
William Shakespeare's The Jedi Doth Return: Star Wars Part the Sixth (2014)
William Shakespeare's Star Wars Trilogy: The Royal Imperial Boxed Set (2014)
William Shakespeare's The Phantom of Menace: Star Wars Part the First (2015)
William Shakespeare's The Clone Army Attacketh: Star Wars Part the Second (2015)
William Shakespeare's Tragedy of the Sith's Revenge: Star Wars Part the Third (2015)
William Shakespeare's The Force Doth Awaken: Star Wars Part the Seventh (2017)
William Shakespeare's Jedi the Last: Star Wars Part the Eighth (2018)
William Shakespeare’s The Merry Rise of Skywalker: Star Wars Part the Ninth (2020)
Pop Shakespeare:
William Shakespeare's Much Ado About Mean Girls (Pop Shakespeare Book 1) (2019)
William Shakespeare's Get Thee...Back to the Future! (Pop Shakespeare Book 2) (2019)
William Shakespeare's The Taming of the Clueless (Pop Shakespeare Book 3) (2020)
William Shakespeare's Christmas Carol (2015)
Deadpool: World's Greatest, Vol. 7: Deadpool Does Shakespeare (2017)
"Palpatine" in From a Certain Point of View (2017)
MacTrump: A Shakespearean Tragicomedy of the Trump Administration, Part I (2019; co-authored with Jacopo della Quercia)
William Shakespeare's Tragical History of Frankenstein (2020)
William Shakespeare's Avengers: The Complete Works (2021)

Non-literary works
On February 11, 2019, Doescher wrote the lyrics for the Star Wars parody of the Hamilton song “My Shot” for a YouTube video on his YouTube channel.

References

External links
Excerpts in Slate

1977 births
Writers from Portland, Oregon
American science fiction writers
Living people
American male novelists
21st-century American novelists
Yale Divinity School alumni
Union Theological Seminary (New York City) alumni
21st-century American male writers
Novelists from Oregon